Guosen Securities Company Limited ("Guosen Securities", "GSEC" or Chinese: 国信证券) is a Chinese state-owned financial services company headquartered in Shenzhen, China, with more than 70 branches and 11,500 employees nationwide. It has offices in 47 major cities in China including Shenzhen, Beijing, Guangzhou, Foshan, Nanjing, Shanghai, Tianjin and Hong Kong. Guosen Securities provides sales and trading, investment banking, research, asset management, private equity, and other financial services with both institutional and retail clients in China and Hong Kong. It also operates a trading platform called GuoXin TradingStation.

The company's heritage can be traced back to 1989, when it was originated from the Shenzhen International Trust and Investment Securities Business Division. In 1996, it became an independent corporation and was renamed as Guosen Securities. As of 2011, 40% of its shares are held by Shenzhen International Holdings as the major shareholder, an investment holding institution jointly owned by Shenzhen provincial government and Cheung Kong Holdings.

In 2011, Guosen Securities gained the second largest market share of 8.8 percent in domestic equity offerings and the 18th market share of 0.9 percent in global equity offerings.

History
1989 – Guosen Securities was originated from the Shenzhen International Trust and Investment Securities Business Division (“SITIS Business Division”), which was one of the three earliest securities business divisions in China's securities market.

Early 1990s – SITIS Business Division accounted for more than 30 percent of the total trading volume of the Shenzhen Stock Exchange.

1994 – Shenzhen International Trust and Investment Securities Company Limited (“SITIS Company”) was officially established with registered capital of RMB 100 million. In spite of a two-year bearish market in China, the company still operated without suffering losses.

1996 – As Shenzhen government aimed to stimulate local securities market, SITIS Company underwent a restructuring and was renamed as Guosen Securities.

1997-1999 – Guosen Securities’ registered capital was raised to RMB 2 billion after twice capital injections from shareholders in 1997 and 1999.

1998 – A joint-venture investment manager, Penghua Fund Management Company Limited, was founded with assets under management of RMB 104 billion as of June, 2011. Guosen Securities as the largest shareholder holds 50% of shares.

2008 – Guosen Securities was restructured as a stock limited company, with an increase of registered capital to RMB 7 billion. A wholly owned subsidiary Guosen Securities (HK) Financial Holdings Company Limited was established in Hong Kong with registered capital of HKD 700 million, which serves as a platform for Guosen Securities’ business internationalization.

2012 – Guosen Securities is scheduling an initial public offering in Shenzhen A-share market, with estimated proceeds of RMB 20 to 30 billion.

2019 - The Hong Kong Securities and Futures Commission (SFC) has reprimanded Guosen Securities (HK) Brokerage Company, Limited (Guosen) and fined it $15.2 million for failures in complying with anti-money laundering (AML) and counter-terrorist financing (CFT) regulatory requirements when handling third party fund deposits. The SFC's investigation revealed that between November 2014 and December 2015, Guosen had processed 10,000 third party deposits totalling approximately $5 billion for more than 3,500 clients.

Structure
The company is organized into five major business arms: sales and trading, investment banking, research, asset management, and private equity.

Sales and Trading
Sales and trading comprises equities, fixed income, currencies and commodities, serving both institutional and retail clients. With 70 branches covering 47 major cities in China, Guosen was ranked top three in terms of trading volume in 2008–10, and accounted for 4.34% of market share in 2011.

Investment Banking
Investment Banking provides a variety of advisory and underwriting services, ranging from equity and debt offerings, pre-IPO financing, merger and acquisition, restructuring and privatisation advisory, compliance advisory, and structured financing. The investment banking arm owns a total of 144 sponsor representatives, which is the largest among investment banks in China.

Between 2006 and 2009, Guosen Securities was ranked the first in total number of initial public offerings in A-share market for four consecutive years. In 2011, Guosen Securities gained the second largest market share of 8.8 percent in domestic equity offerings and the 18th market share of 0.9 percent in global equity offerings.

Asset Management
Asset Management offers a wide range of investment products in equities, fixed income, fund of funds, and direct financing, in order to meet clients’ diversified requirements and goals.  Guosen's asset management arm is also the first company to offer equity division advisory services among Chinese rivals. 
In Hong Kong, the AM team provides both traditional and alternative investment products. The traditional funds mainly focus on offshore public/private funds in equities, fixed income, balanced portfolios, as well as QFII investments. Whereas the alternative investment products offered include hedge funds, fund of funds, commodity exchange funds, private equity and red wine funds, etc.

Penghua Fund Management Company Limited
Founded in, Penghua Fund Management Company Limited (“Penghua”) is an independent investment manager with RMB 91 billion assets under management (AUM). The company mainly focuses on third-party assets, principally through equities and fixed income, including retail funds, Social Security Funds (SSFs), QDIIs and discretionary accounts. It is currently managing 2 closed-end funds, 21 open-end funds, and 5 SSFs. Guosen Securities, as the largest shareholder, holds 50 percent of Penghua's shares.

Private Equity
Guosen H&S Investment Company Limited
Guosen H&S Investment Company Limited is a wholly subsidy of Guosen Securities with registered capital of RMB 1 billion, specializing in direct private equity investment. Guosen Securities is the third securities firm that is approved to carry out direct investment business in China.

Poor Compliance
2019 - The Hong Kong Securities and Futures Commission (SFC) has reprimanded Guosen Securities (HK) Brokerage Company, Limited (Guosen) and fined it $15.2 million for failures in complying with anti-money laundering (AML) and counter-terrorist financing (CFT) regulatory requirements when handling third party fund deposits. The SFC's investigation revealed that between November 2014 and December 2015, Guosen had processed 10,000 third party deposits totalling approximately $5 billion for more than 3,500 clients.

Ownership Structure
Guosen Securities' current chairman is He Ru. The company currently has 5 major shareholders, shareholding structure as follow:

See also 
 Securities industry in China

References

Asia ETrading, Retrieved 10 Jan 2011 Kx Systems Signs OEM Deal With Guosen Securities.
Bloomberg News, Retrieved 25 July 2011 Top China IPO Arranger Guosen Challenges Goldman With Hong Kong Expansion.
Bloomberg Businessweek, Retrieved 5 Oct 2011 Guosen Securities Co., Ltd..
New Fortune 8th New Fortune Best Analysts
Reuters Article, Retrieved 13 Jan 2011 Guosen Securities raises yuan China PE fund in HK

External links
 

Chinese brands
Companies based in Shenzhen
Companies listed on the Shenzhen Stock Exchange
Financial services companies of China
Government-owned companies of China
Investment banks in China
Financial services companies established in 1989
Chinese companies established in 1989